Negative energy is a concept used in physics to explain the nature of certain fields, including the gravitational field and various quantum field effects.

Gravitational potential energy

Gravitational potential energy can be defined as being negative, but it has no physical meaning since a potential energy is always defined up to a constant.

Solving this differential equation leads to 

 is often taken equal to 0 so that the potential energy at infinity is 0, then the potential energy is always negative for any distance. Potential energy should not be confused with the field energy density or its integral, even if related.
As two massive objects move towards each other, the motion accelerates under gravity causing an increase in the (positive) kinetic energy of the system and decrease of the same amount in the gravitational potential energy of the object. This is because the law of conservation of energy requires that the net energy of the system will not change. The gravitational potential energy is a kind of binding energy. 

A universe in which positive energy dominates will eventually collapse in a "Big Crunch", while an "open" universe in which negative energy dominates will either expand indefinitely or eventually disintegrate in a "big rip". In the zero-energy universe model ("flat" or "Euclidean"), the total amount of energy in the universe is exactly zero: its amount of positive energy in the form of matter is exactly cancelled out by its negative energy in the form of gravity. It is unclear which, if any, of these models accurately describes the real universe.

Quantum field effects
Negative energies and negative energy density are consistent with quantum field theory.

Virtual particles

In quantum theory, the uncertainty principle allows the vacuum of space to be filled with virtual particle-antiparticle pairs which appear spontaneously and exist for only a short time before, typically, annihilating themselves again. Some of these virtual particles can have negative energy. Their behaviour plays a role in several important phenomena, as described below.

Casimir effect

In the Casimir effect, two flat plates placed very close together restrict the wavelengths of quanta which can exist between them. This in turn restricts the types and hence number and density of virtual particle pairs which can form in the intervening vacuum and can result in a negative energy density. Since this restriction does not exist or is much less significant on the opposite sides of the plates, the forces outside the plates are greater than those between the plates. This causes the plates to appear to pull on each other, which has been measured. More accurately, the vacuum energy caused by the virtual particle pairs is pushing the plates together, and the vacuum energy between the plates is too small to negate this effect since fewer virtual particles can exist per unit volume between the plates than can exist outside them.

Squeezed light

It is possible to arrange multiple beams of laser light such that destructive quantum interference suppresses the vacuum fluctuations. Such a squeezed vacuum state involves negative energy. The repetitive waveform of light leads to alternating regions of positive and negative energy.

Dirac sea

According to the theory of the Dirac sea, developed by Paul Dirac in 1930, the vacuum of space is full of negative energy. This theory was developed to explain the anomaly of negative-energy quantum states predicted by the Dirac equation.

The Dirac sea theory correctly predicted the existence of antimatter two years prior to the discovery of the positron in 1932 by Carl Anderson. However, the Dirac sea theory treats antimatter as a hole where there is the absence of a particle rather than as a real particle. Quantum field theory (QFT), developed in the 1930s, deals with antimatter in a way that treats antimatter as made of real particles rather than the absence of particles, and treats a vacuum as being empty of particles rather than full of negative-energy particles like in the Dirac sea theory.

Quantum field theory has displaced the Dirac sea theory as a more popular explanation of these aspects of physics. Both the Dirac sea theory and quantum field theory are equivalent by means of a Bogoliubov transformation, so the Dirac sea can be viewed as an alternative formulation of quantum field theory, and is thus consistent with it.

Quantum gravity phenomena
The intense gravitational fields around black holes create phenomena which are attributed to both gravitational and quantum effects. In these situations, a particle's Killing vector may be rotated such that its energy becomes negative.

Hawking radiation

Virtual particles can exist for a short period. When a pair of such particles appears next to a black hole's event horizon, one of them may get drawn in. This rotates its Killing vector so that its energy becomes negative and the pair have no net energy. This allows them to become real and the positive particle escapes as Hawking radiation, while the negative-energy particle reduces the black hole's net energy. Thus, a black hole may slowly evaporate.

Black hole ergosphere and quasars
For a rotating black hole, the rotation creates an ergosphere outside the event horizon. Since the ergosphere is outside the event horizon, particles can escape from it. Within the ergosphere, a particle's Killing vector may be rotated to give it negative energy. The negative-energy particle then crosses the event horizon into the black hole, with the law of conservation of energy requiring that an equal amount of positive energy should escape. This is thought to be how the intense radiation emitted by quasars is generated.

Speculative suggestions

Wormholes

Negative energy appears in the speculative theory of wormholes, where it is needed to keep the wormhole open. A wormhole directly connects two locations which may be separated arbitrarily far apart in both space and time, and in principle allows near-instantaneous travel between them. However physicists such as Roger Penrose regard such ideas as unrealistic, more fiction than speculation.

Warp drive

A theoretical principle for a faster-than-light (FTL) warp drive for spaceships has been suggested, involving negative energy. The Alcubierre drive comprises a solution to Einstein's equations of general relativity, in which a bubble of spacetime is moved rapidly by expanding space behind it and shrinking space in front of it.

See also
Antimatter
Dark energy
Dark matter
Exotic matter
Negative mass

References

Inline notes

Bibliography
 Lawrence H. Ford and Thomas A. Roman; "Negative energy, wormholes and warp drive", Scientific American January 2000, 282, Pages 46–53.
 Roger Penrose; The Road to Reality, ppbk, Vintage, 2005. Chapter 30: Gravity's Role in Quantum State Reduction.
Energy (physics)